Whitwell is a village in the parish of St Paul's Walden  about six miles south of Hitchin in Hertfordshire, England. Situated on a tableland, a spur of the Chilterns, Whitwell is about 122m (400 feet) above sea level. The soil is mostly clay with flints.

It contains a number of early brick and half-timbered houses, several of which are of the 18th century.  Waterhall Farm (an open farm and craft centre) is one of the village's attractions. 

With the River Mimram running north-west to south-east through Whitwell, the village has been noted (apparently since Roman times) for its production of prime watercress.

In 2019, construction began on a new housing development named The Heath, located on Bendish Lane opposite St. paul’s Walden School. It opened in Summer 2020, with the new road named ‘Chime Dell’ after a field formerly located on the site.

History
Whitwell was once known for its ‘notorious seven’ public houses, but today only one remains; The Bull Inn. The most recent to close was The Maiden's Head in 2015, which is currently (2021) being developed as a private residence.

From 1926, a factory building on Hitchin Road on the east side of the village was home to engineering company C & A Roberts. The site remained until 2000, when it was demolished, and was eventually replaced by a street of houses named Roberts Court.

Roman coins have been found in Whitwell.

Whitwell Players
Whitwell also has a thriving amateur dramatics society - The Whitwell Players. As far as it is possible to tell, there has been some form of am dram society in Whitwell for over a century, but The Whitwell Players, in its current guise, came into being in the 1980s. The players perform at least two or three times a year in Spring, Autumn and a Panto in December. As a result of their labours, many people have benefitted as the Players make donations to support local charities on a regular basis.

Highlights include: the company's first Shakespearean production - A Midsummer Night's dream - in 2002, performed both in the village hall and in the open air at the stunning St Paul's Walden Bury gardens, as well as Much Ado About Nothing, Hobson's Choice, Allo, Allo, Blackadder, Calendar Girls, and See How They Run.

References

Villages in Hertfordshire